The A431 is an A road running from Bristol to Bath in England.

Route
From there it runs through Hanham, Longwell Green, Bitton and Kelston. It passes around the edge of Kelston Round Hill, and past the estate of Sir John Hawkins to Newbridge, Bath, where it joins the A4 which continues to central Bath. Some of the road runs on the alignment of a Roman road between Bristol and Bath.

History
What is now the A431 was the upper turnpike between Bristol and Bath, north of the River Avon (the lower turnpike, south of the Avon, being the A4). Both roads were turnpiked by the Bath Trust in 1707. The Bristol Trust attempted to turnpike the western half of the upper road, but faced opposition from colliers at Kingswood, and it was not fully completed until the 1740s. By the 19th century, the Upper Bristol Road to Kelston was described as a "pleasing and nearly level ride".

When roads were first numbered in 1923, the A431 formed the full extent of the upper Bristol – Bath turnpike as far as the old Post Office at the corner of George Street and Milsom Street. In 1935, the Ministry of Transport rerouted the A4 along this route towards Bristol and Avonmouth, curtailing the A431 to its current eastern point at Newbridge.

Incidents

Kelston Park landslip
In February 2014 the road was closed near Kelston Park due to a landslip. The closure lasted until 17 November 2014 as the ground continued to move.
Local resident Mike Watts created a private toll road over agricultural land to bypass the closed section, which opened in August 2014.

See also
 British road numbering scheme

References
Citations

Sources

External links 

SABRE website: description of route

Roads in England
Roads in Bristol
Roads in Gloucestershire
Roads in Somerset